Acacia notabilis, known colloquially as mallee golden wattle, Flinders wattle or stiff golden wattle, is a species of Acacia native to Australia.

Description
It has smooth reddish-brown coloured bark and spreading, almost terete and glabrous branches. Like most species of Acacia it has phyllodes rather than true leaves. They have a prominent mid-vein with many fine lateral veins and thickened margins. It blooms between July and October producing short flower-spikes located in axillary racemes composed spherical flower-heads made up of 4 to 16 deep yellow flowers.

Taxonomy
The species was first formally described by the botanist Ferdinand von Mueller in 1858 as part of the work Fragmenta Phytographiae Australiae. It was reclassified by Leslie Pedley in 2003 as Racosperma notabile but transferred back to genus Acacia in 2014.
It is related to Acacia beckleri.

Distribution
The shrub is native to the Broken Hill district of arid far western New South Wales as well as Victoria and South Australia. The bulk of the population is found in South Australia where the shrub is considered to be quite common. In South Australia it is found on the Eyre Peninsula, the Flinders Ranges, the Mount Lofty Ranges and the Yorke Peninsula as well as more arid areas inland. It is usually found growing in hard and shallow calcareous, alkaline, red or brown coloured duplex soils as a part of low woodland or open scrubland communities.

See also
List of Acacia species

References

notabilis
Fabales of Australia
Flora of New South Wales
Plants described in 1858
Taxa named by Ferdinand von Mueller